Ian James Corlett (born August 29, 1962) is a Canadian voice actor, animator, and author. He is the creator of Studio B Productions' animated series Being Ian and Yvon of the Yukon. One of his best-known animation roles was the first English voice of adult Goku in the Ocean dub of Dragon Ball Z in 1996–1997, and the voice of Cheetor in Beast Wars: Transformers and Beast Machines: Transformers.

Career
Corlett began his career in 1984. In addition to programming some drum tracks and helping with some computer sequences on Queensrÿche's album Operation: Mindcrime, and also selling the band some music gear in the 1980s, Corlett also lent his voice to several animated series produced/dubbed in Canada. His most notable voice roles included the title character of the Mega Man TV show, Cheetor in Beast Wars: Transformers, Glitch-Bob in ReBoot, and Andy Larkin in What's with Andy?. Another notable, yet brief starring role of Corlett's was Goku in Funimation/Saban's original dub of Dragon Ball Z. Corlett has also lent his voice to less known DIC Entertainment shows such as Super Duper Sumos. He also voiced Mr. Cramp in The Cramp Twins. In Salty's Lighthouse, he played Ten Cents, Otis, Zeebee, Zip, Lord Stinker, Frank, Eddie, and the Lighthouse Clock. He voiced Ransome the Clown in the video game Thimbleweed Park.

Through a coincidence, Corlett who voiced Dr. Wily in DIC's video-game oriented cartoon Captain N: The Game Master would later voice his nemesis Mega Man in the Ruby-Spears cartoon adaptation of the games.

He along with fellow Canadian voice actor Terry Klassen owned a production company who helped rewrite international shows.

Corlett currently serves as the English voice of Miroku for the Japanese anime series Yashahime: Princess Half-Demon, replacing Kirby Morrow who was the original English voice actor for Miroku in the Inuyasha series until his death on November 18, 2020. In what would be his final voice role before his passing in November 2020, Morrow voiced Miroku in the first episode of Yashahime, which was released in English on June 27, 2021, seven months after Morrow's death.

Personal life
Corlett lives in Vancouver with his wife and two children, Philip (born 1997) and Claire Corlett (born 1999). They have done voice work for two different animated series, Dinosaur Train and My Little Pony: Friendship Is Magic, respectively. He also has a home in Palm Springs, California. In addition to his work in Vancouver, he does voice work in Los Angeles, California in the United States.

Filmography

Film

Anime

Animation

Video games

Bibliography
 E is for Ethics (Simon & Schuster, Atria Books, 2009)
 E is for Environment (Simon & Schuster, Atria Books, 2011)

References

Citations

Book references

External links
 
 
 
 

1962 births
Living people
Canadian children's writers
Canadian expatriate male actors in the United States
Film producers from British Columbia
Canadian impressionists (entertainers)
Canadian male screenwriters
Canadian male television writers
Canadian male voice actors
Canadian people of Manx descent
Canadian people of Polish descent
Canadian people of Scottish descent
Male actors from British Columbia
Male actors from Los Angeles
People from Burnaby
Writers from British Columbia
Writers from Los Angeles
20th-century Canadian male actors
21st-century Canadian male actors